Jovan Spasic (7 September 1909 in Leskovac – 9 April 1981 in Rovinj) represented Yugoslav as a goalkeeper.

Before playing football, he worked as a stone worker in Leskovac SK Momcilo.  From 1929, he played for Belgrade SK, making 281 appearances, letting in 403 goals. He played there until 1938. For the Yugoslavia national football team he made 15 appearances. He made his debut for Yugoslavia on 15 March 1931 against Greece (4–1) in Belgrade, and the played his last match on 12 July 1936 against Turkey (3–3) in Istanbul.

After World War II he worked as a coach in Mačva from Sabac and Belgrade for several clubs, and at one time led the team deaf.

External links
 
 

1909 births
1981 deaths
Sportspeople from Leskovac
Serbian footballers
Association football goalkeepers
Yugoslavia international footballers